Hg is a private equity firm targeting technology buyouts primarily in Europe and the US. Hg focuses on investments in technology and services sectors. It invests out of its 8th £2.5 billion core fund and its 2nd £575 million Mercury fund, targeting smaller technology buyouts, both raised in February 2017. Both funds were closed on their hard-caps and were more than 3x oversubscribed versus their targets, receiving strong re-ups from existing investors. The company raised its 1st time £1.5B Saturn large-cap fund in March 2018 and in 2020 raised $11B across three funds, Mercury 3, Genesis 9 and Saturn 2.

In total, Hg has more than $55B funds under management. The company has close to 120 employees in investment offices in London, UK, Munich, Germany, San Francisco, and New York, NY, and serves over 100 institutional investors, including private and public pension funds, endowments, insurance companies and fund of funds.

History
Hg began life as Mercury Private Equity, the private equity arm of Mercury Asset Management plc, a long-established UK-based asset management firm. Mercury Asset Management was acquired by Merrill Lynch in 1997. In December 2000, the executives of Mercury Private Equity negotiated independence from Merrill Lynch, and HgCapital (as it was then known) was established as a fully independent partnership wholly owned by its Partners and employees, who together work with a common purpose and culture.

Investments
Hg is invested in more than 30 companies across Europe and the US, and has invested in over 70 companies since its inception. One of its most prominent investments is Visma, a Scandinavian software business. In August 2020 Hg led the $12.2B buyout of Visma, Europe's largest software buyout to date.
In 2022, Hg Capital purchased Ideagen PLC, a UK GRC company, for £1 bn.

References

External links

Company overview on Businessweek

Private equity firms of the United Kingdom
Financial services companies based in London
Financial services companies established in 2000
2000 establishments in England